Santa Rita do Passa Quatro is a municipality in the state of São Paulo in Brazil. 

The municipality holds the Cerrado Pé de Gigante Area of Relevant Ecological Interest and the Buriti de Vassununga Area of Relevant Ecological Interest.
It contains the  Vassununga State Park, established in 1970, which contains what may be the oldest tree in Brazil.

A species of amphisbaenian, Amphisbaena sanctaeritae, is named after the municipality.

References

Municipalities in São Paulo (state)